The president of the Congress of Deputies, also known as the president of the Cortes, is the highest authority of the Congress of Deputies of Spain, the lower house of the Cortes Generales. The President is elected by and among the incumbent members of congress (diputados).

The office was established in 1810 when the Supreme Central Junta convened the first Spain's general election to form the Cortes of Cádiz. In the first meeting of the Cortes, on 24 September 1810, the first president was elected, Ramón Lázaro de Dou y de Bassols, although Benito Ramón Hermida Maldonado held the office as acting president during the beginning of that meeting. During this time, the Cortes were a unicameral parliament and the tenure of the president of the house was 1 month. In 1814, King Ferdinand VII dissolved the parliament and abolished the 1812 Constitution, restoring absolutism. Briefly, from 1820 to 1823, the Constitution was restored against the will of the monarch and in 1823 the King abolished it again until his death in 1833, when Queen Regent Maria Christina, in order to gain the favour of the Liberals to support the reign of her daughter, Isabella II, approved the Royal Statue of 1834, creating a bicameral parliament and restoring the office. The parliament was inactive in three more times in Spanish history: from 1923 to 1927 due to the dictatorship of Primo de Rivera (although he created an advisory assembly from 1927 to 1929), from 1929 to 1931 after the dictatorship and from 1939 to 1943, after the Civil War.

After 1834, none of the constitutions or the different internal rules of the Congress established a time limited to held the office, so it is understood that he or she occupies it for the time of the legislature, an idea that continues today in force. Another peculiarity of Spanish parliamentarism is the existence of the position of acting president. After every general election and before the Congress is fully constituted, the Congress' internal rules from 1834 to 1982 established that an acting president had to be elected, and, once the Congress is fully constituted, the House must ratified the appointment or elect a new president. In 1982, this position disappeared.

The current and 181st President, Meritxell Batet, was elected for the first time on May 21, 2019. She was re-elected on December 3, 2019. In both occasions, she represented Barcelona.

List of presidents
Since its creation in 1810, 137 people have served as president in 181 presidencies. The first president was Ramón Lázaro de Dou y de Bassols who served during the first month. The shortest presidency was that of the Francisco Salmerón y Alonso which was president briefly between March 19 and March 22, 1873, and the longest was that of Esteban de Bilbao Eguía serving 22 years, 6 months and 13 days. Many presidents have served in non-consecutive terms in office; The Marquess of Vega de Armijo served in five non-consecutive terms while Francisco Martínez de la Rosa and Francisco Javier Istúriz y Montero served in four. The first woman who have served as president was Luisa Fernanda Rudi Ubeda, between 2000 and 2004.

Presidents by time in office
The length of time given below is based on the difference between dates. Many presidents were elected multiple times, and to terms that were, in several instances, not consecutive; the length of time given for each president measures their cumulative length of incumbency as president (even if they were elected as acting president). The time after adjournment of one Congress but before the convening of the next Congress is also counted.

References

Presidents
Congress
 
Lists of political office-holders in Spain